"Thela Hun Ginjeet" is a single by the band King Crimson, released in 1981 and on the album Discipline (1981). The song name is an anagram of "heat in the jungle", which is a reference to crime in the city. (The term "heat" is American slang for firearms or for police.)

While most of the instruments are in  time, Robert Fripp's electric guitar plays in  time during part of the song, creating an unusual effect. In the middle of the song, voice recordings are heard. Adrian Belew talks about his experiences with  London Rastafarians and the police, while he was trying to get voice recordings for the song.

Live versions
During their tour for the Discipline and Beat albums, Belew would tell the story while the song was being performed. During the Beat tour, the story-telling was somewhat improvised. In later live performances, beginning on the Three of a Perfect Pair tour, as evidenced by the performance on Absent Lovers: Live in Montreal, the storytelling was dropped, leaving only the sung lyrics.

The storytelling re-appeared on the Double Trio tours (cf. Vrooom Vrooom) but it was in the form of a backing tape identical to the album version.

Cover versions
 Groups with Discipline-era King Crimson members (e.g. Adrian Belew Power Trio, Stick Men, The Crimson ProjeKCt) have covered the song live.
 Les Claypool has covered this song live, along with Primus, his musical project Colonel Les Claypool's Fearless Flying Frog Brigade (included on their live album Live Frogs Set 1), and The Claypool Lennon Delirium.

Track listing

7" version
"Thela Hun Ginjeet" (Adrian Belew, Bill Bruford, Robert Fripp, Tony Levin)
"Elephant Talk" (Belew, Bruford, Fripp, Levin)

12" version
"Thela Hun Ginjeet" (dance mix) (Belew, Bruford, Fripp, Levin)
"Elephant Talk" (Belew, Bruford, Fripp, Levin)
"Indiscipline" (Belew, Bruford, Fripp, Levin)

Personnel
Robert Fripp – guitar
Adrian Belew – guitar, lead vocals
Tony Levin – bass guitar, backing vocals
Bill Bruford – drums

Notes

King Crimson songs
1981 singles
Songs written by Adrian Belew
Songs written by Bill Bruford
Songs written by Robert Fripp
Songs written by Tony Levin
1981 songs
Warner Records singles